Wadi Jufan and Habasha is a sub-district located in Harf Sufyan District, 'Amran Governorate, Yemen. Wadi Jufan and Habasha had a population of 2009 according to the 2004 census.

References 

Sub-districts in Harf Sufyan District